Nintendo World is a Brazilian video game magazine, which covers games for the Nintendo Wii, Wii U, 3DS and DS. It was created in 1998 by the Conrad Editora. Initially it covered games for the Nintendo 64 and Game Boy Color consoles, which were very popular in the country at the time and were distributed in the country by the Estrela/Gradiente joint-venture. Over 100 issues have been published as of 2006, and the magazine has been awarded by Nintendo of America for its high readership and for being one of the best quality Nintendo magazines in Latin America. Its current editor is Editora Tambor. From issue 60 onwards, the magazine started featuring content from Nintendo Power.

References

External links
 

1998 establishments in Brazil
Magazines published in Brazil
Magazines established in 1998
Magazines about Nintendo
Portuguese-language magazines